"Bring On the Dancing Horses" is a single by Echo & the Bunnymen which was released on 14 October 1985. It was the only single from their 1985  compilation album Songs to Learn & Sing, and was recorded for the John Hughes film Pretty in Pink.

It reached number 21 on the UK Singles Chart and number 15 on the Irish Singles Chart. Allmusic journalist Stewart Mason said that the layers of synths on the song and Ian McCulloch's overdubbed vocals on the chorus add to the "psychedelic haze of the track". Mason wrote: "Bring On the Dancing Horses has a dreamily catchy chorus and a nice melody."

Versions
The single was released as a 7-inch single, a 12-inch single and a shaped picture disc. On the 7-inch single and the picture disc the title track is three minutes and 59 seconds long and the b-side is "Over Your Shoulder". The title track was extended by one minute and 38 seconds for the 12-inch single, to five minutes and 37 seconds, and an extra track, "Bedbugs and Ballyhoo", was added to the b-side. The 7-inch single was also released as a limited edition with an extra disc containing "Villiers Terrace" and "Monkeys" from the August 1979 John Peel session. Laurie Latham produced the title track and The Bunnymen produced the b-sides. The singles were released on Korova in the United Kingdom and on WEA elsewhere.

Cover versions
Skate punk band Lagwagon covered the song for the 1999 Vagrant Records compilation, Before You Were Punk 2.

A version of the song, performed by Universal Circus, is included on the 2005 Spanish tribute album Play the Game: Un Tributo a Echo & the Bunnymen.

The Brixton Riot recorded a cover version in 2018 for the Mint 400 Records At the Movies compilation album.

Iron & Wine and Calexico played a cover version of the song at most concerts of their 2019 joint tour.

Track listings
All tracks written by Will Sergeant, Ian McCulloch, Les Pattinson and Pete de Freitas.

7-inch (Korova KOW 43, WEA S248933-7) and picture disc (Korova KOW 43P, WEA 248933–7)
"Bring On the Dancing Horses" – 3:59
"Over Your Shoulder" – 4:04

12-inch release (Korova KOW 43T, WEA 248932–0)
"Bring On the Dancing Horses" – 5:37
"Bedbugs and Ballyhoo" – 3:35
"Over Your Shoulder" – 4:04

Chart positions

Personnel
Ian McCulloch – vocals, guitar
Will Sergeant – lead guitar
Les Pattinson – bass
Pete de Freitas – drums
Laurie Latham – producer
The Bunnymen – producer

References

1985 singles
Echo & the Bunnymen songs
Songs written by Ian McCulloch (singer)
Songs written by Will Sergeant
Songs written by Les Pattinson
Songs written by Pete de Freitas
Music videos directed by Anton Corbijn
1985 songs